Kidston Solar Project is a photovoltaic solar power station built on top of the former Kidston Gold Mine utilising the tailings storage facility in northern Queensland, Australia. The Kidston Solar Project (KS1) is the first of four projects that comprise the Kidston Clean Energy Hub also occupying this area. It generates up to 145GWh of renewable electricity per year.  In total, there are 540,000 panels that makes up the project, manufactured by company First Solar Inc on a single axis tracking system. The photovoltaic panels are mounted on the tracking system which shifts the angle of the panels to follow the sun.

Financial close was reached in February 2017 for KS1, with first energisation occurring in November 2017. It is now fully commissioned and operational, connected to the existing 132Kv transmission line powered by Ergon Energy and generating electricity into the NEM. 

Construction was fully funded at $115M with construction activities for the project built on-time and on-budget via the project's EPC contractor, UGL. Financing was underpinned by the 20-year Revenue Support Deed with the Queensland Government for 100% of the energy generated from the Project, in addition to a $8.9M funding grant provided by the Australian Renewable Energy Agency.

In April 2022, Kidston Solar Project was rated as the best-performing solar farm in Australia, with a capacity factor of 26.4%.

References

Solar power stations in Queensland
Einasleigh, Queensland